Ogasawarana hirasei is a species of land snail, a terrestrial gastropod mollusk in the family Helicinidae. This species is endemic to Japan.

References

Molluscs of Japan
Helicinidae
Gastropods described in 1902
Taxonomy articles created by Polbot